The Adelaide pygmy blue-tongue skink (Tiliqua adelaidensis) or pygmy bluetongue is a species of skink, a lizard in the family Scincidae. The species was previously thought to be extinct and only rediscovered in 1992.

Rediscovery and conservation
Found only in the Mid North of South Australia, T. adelaidensis was for a time believed to be extinct. It was rediscovered in 1992, when a researcher found the remains of an adult male T. adelaidensis in the stomach contents of a dead brown snake, near Burra. The pygmy bluetongue is now considered to be an endangered species.

The habitat and range of pygmy bluetongues is very restricted, as individuals live in old spider burrows within areas of unploughed native grasslands, which have become rare due to extensive development of cereal cropping throughout the region. Since their rediscovery, surveys have estimated that 5,000 to 7,000 individuals live in scattered areas between Kapunda and Peterborough.

Conservation efforts to maintain the species include the establishment of the Tiliqua Pygmy Bluetongue Reserve near Burra, by the Nature Foundation SA in 2010.

In February 2016 Zoos SA announced the first success of a captive breeding program of pygmy bluetongues at Monarto Zoo.

In January 2020 researchers at Flinders University won an Australian Research Council Linkage Projects grant of more than A$400,000 for a five-year project aimed at saving the lizard from extinction due to climate change.

Ecology
When artificial burrows were offered in the field to T. adelaidensis lizards, all the lizards preferred vertical rather than angled burrows and juvenile lizards preferred more shallow burrows than did adult lizards. Observation of 36 artificial burrows showed a significant increase in lizard numbers during 2001–2002 and over three surveys. The study suggests that this local increase in population could be due to lizards locating appropriate burrows much easier. The study results suggest that artificial burrows could be a tool for conservation management of this species.

Another study compared the fitness of female lizards in natural burrows and artificial ones, over a three-year period. The study showed that the female in the artificial burrows had a better body condition, and produced larger offspring with better body conditions.

References

External links

Further reading
Boulenger GA (1887). Catalogue of the Lizards in the British Museum (Natural History). Second Edition. Volume III ... Scincidæ ... London: Trustees of the British Museum (Natural History). (Taylor and Francis, printers). xii + 575 pp. + Plates I–XL. (Tiliqua adelaidensis, p. 148).
Peters W (1863). "Eine Übersicht der von Hrn. Richard Schonburgk an das zoologische Museum eingesandten Amphibien, aus Buchsfelde bei Adelaide in Südaustralien ". Monatsberichte der Königlich Preussischen Akademie der Wissenschaften zu Berlin 1863: 228-236. (Cyclodus adelaidensis, new species, p. 232). (in German).
Smith MA (1937). "A Review of the Genus Lygosoma (Scincidae: Reptilia) and its Allies". Rec. Indian Mus. 39 (3): 213-234.

Reptiles of South Australia
Reptiles described in 1863
Taxa named by Wilhelm Peters
Tiliqua
Taxonomy articles created by Polbot
Skinks of Australia